Majid Vasheghani Farahani (born May 27, 1980) is an Iranian actor. He is best known for his acting in Detour (2012), Under the Mother's Feet (2017) and From Destiny (2019–2022). Vasheghani gained recognition and popularity for playing in reality shows Mafia Nights (2020–2022) and Joker (2022). He won a Honorary Diploma at the 13th Iran International FICTS Festival for his performance in the sport drama The Highway (2019).

Early life
Majid Vasheghani Farahani was born on May 27, 1980 in Tehran, Iran. He is the first child in the family and his only sister is a sports coach. His father is an Air Force soldier and his mother is a housewife. 

He graduated with a Bachelor's degree in Metallurgical engineering. Vashghani started acting from 1998 by attending Amin Tarokh's acting classes.

Career

Him and director Behrang Tofighi are frequent collaborators. They have collaborated nine times in The Losers Squad (2011), Spare (2012), Dominos (2012), Detour (2012), Burning (2014), Beautiful Revolution (2014), Amen (2015), The Roof Top of Tehran (2016) and Under the Mother's Feet (2017).

On June 20, 2022, he won his first award at the 13th Iran International FICTS Festival for his performance in the sport drama The Highway (2019).

Influences

In an interview in 2013, Vasheghani cited Khosrow Shakibai, Parviz Parastui, Reza Kianian and Hamid Farrokhnezhad as his favorite Iranian actors and acting influences. When the interviewer asked him about his favorite Iranian films and television series, he said Captain Khorshid (1987), Low Heights (2002), The Third Day (2007) and Around the Highway (2009) films and Sarbadars (1983) and Kouchak Jangali (1987) television series.

Filmography

Film

Web

Television

Theatre

Awards and nominations

See also 
 Iranian cinema

References

External links 

 

Iranian male film actors
Iranian male television actors
Living people
1980 births